Kantha is a 2013 Tamil-language drama film directed by Babu Viswanath. It stars Karan and Mithra Kurian in the lead roles. The film was released after a five-year delay, in March 2013.

Cast 
Karan as Kantha
Mithra Kurian
Rajesh
Vivek as Thangamagan
Riyaz Khan
Dhandapani
Sathyan
Aarthi
Cell Murugan

Production 
Viswanath, who had earlier worked as an assistant to director Saran in the films Jay Jay, Attagasam and Vasool Raja MBBS, announced that he would make a film featuring actor Karan and Shakti R. Selva, a keyboard player with A. R. Rahman, made his debut as a music director through the film. Filming began in February 2008 and the team initially announced a release in October 2008, but this was not met. The film was entirely shot in Thanjavur, with scenes shot at the bus stand and at SB Nagar Grounds.

In March 2012, a City Civil Court suspended the release of the film after a dispute arose of money transaction between the producer and a financier. Petitioner Mohan Kumar, the financier had lent Rs. 25 lakh to assist the producer, Pazhanivel, in the production of the film with a promise that the money should be paid within the stipulated time mentioned in the agreement. But, the producers did not pay the amount in cash instead they produced two cheque leaves to the financier that bounced at the bank for lack of funds in the account. As Mohan Kumar could not get the amount from the producers, he approached the court to stop the film release until the producers pay him the amount. The film faced further troubles when actor Karan complained of non-payment of his salary and when Babu Vishwanath walked out of the film to direct another venture titled Theradi Veethi. The film was later released in March 2013 on a small scale, almost five years after production had begun.

References 

2013 films
2010s Tamil-language films